In the Money is a 1958 comedy film directed by William Beaudine and starring The Bowery Boys. The film was released on February 16, 1958, by Allied Artists Pictures and is the 48th and final film in the series. It was directed by William Beaudine and written by Al Martin and Elwood Ullman.

Plot
Sach is hired to take care of Gloria, a poodle, on an overseas trip to London, England. Unbeknownst to Sach, the people who hired him are diamond smugglers, who have hidden some diamonds under some false fur on Gloria. The rest of The Bowery Boys are jealous of Sach's job, and the large amount of money he receives as a result. The boys also believe that Sach is taking care of a pretty female. They decide to sneak onto the ship Sach is boarding for London, only to wind up swabbing the deck as punishment for being stowaways. Once in England, Sach and the boys soon catch on to the smugglers' scheme. Unfortunately, Inspector Herbert Saunders, one of the smartest detectives of Scotland Yard, accuses the Boys of being the smugglers.

Cast

The Bowery Boys
Huntz Hall as Horace Debussy 'Sach' Jones
Stanley Clements as Stanislaus 'Duke' Coveleskie
David Gorcey as Charles 'Chuck' Anderson
Eddie LeRoy as Blinky

Remaining cast
Patricia Donahue as Babs DeWitt
Paul Cavanagh as Inspector Herbert Saunders
Leonard Penn as Don Clarke
John Dodsworth as Blake Cummings
Ashley Cowan as Bellboy (uncredited)
Leslie Denison as Inspector White (uncredited)
Dick Elliott as Mike Clancy (uncredited)
Ralph Gamble as Randall (uncredited)
Pamela Light as Girl with French Heels (uncredited)
Owen McGiveney as Dr. Rufus B. Smedley (uncredited)
Jack Mulhall undetermined role (scenes deleted)
Patric O'Moore as Reggie (uncredited)
Snub Pollard as Scotland Yard Valet (uncredited)
Norma Varden as Dowager, Owner of Madeline (uncredited)

Home media
Warner Archives released the film on made-to-order DVD in the United States as part of "The Bowery Boys, Volume Four" on August 26, 2014.

References

External links

1958 comedy films
1958 films
Bowery Boys films
American black-and-white films
1950s English-language films
Films directed by William Beaudine
American comedy films
Films set in London
Allied Artists films
1950s American films